Gia [Giorgi or George] Maisashvili (November 24, 1962 – February 26, 2018) was a Georgian economist and politician who was a presidential candidate in the Georgian presidential election of 2008.

Born in Tbilisi, Maisashvili graduated from the Tbilisi State University in 1985.  He became involved in pro-independence movement against the Soviet Union in the late 1980s and placed himself at the forefront in the struggle for Georgian independence and democracy, which was achieved in 1991.

In 1991–92, he became an instrumental figure in transitioning Georgia into the free-market economic system by founding the country's first ever commodity exchanges – Tbilisi Universal Exchange and Georgian Tea and Wine Exchange.

Following the Georgian Civil War and the consequent overthrow of the country's first democratically elected government by the forces of Eduard Shevardnadze in 1992, Maisashvili was forced to flee the country and seek refuge abroad.  He was granted political asylum by the United States.

While living in the US, he earned an MPA from the Kennedy School of Government at Harvard University in 1997 and that same year, became married to an American lawyer, Robin Lightner.  Soon after, he joined the Houston, Texas-based energy company Enron and served as the head of a risk analysis division until resigning from the company in 2001, shortly before the scandal.

He returned to Georgia on the eve of the 2003 Rose Revolution and became a political mentor and an economic adviser to then opposition leader Mikheil Saakashvili. Shortly after Saakashvili's ascend to power, Maisashvili became publicly critical of Saakashvili and distanced himself from the new president.  In July 2007, he established his own political party – the Party of Future (momavlis partia).

He ran as a Presidential candidate for the early elections called on January 5, 2008. He made a major focus on economy and social solidarity, and supported Georgia's bid to join NATO. On November 30, 2007, in what is now considered the critical blunder of his campaign, he stated that he would rather support Mikheil Saakashvili in the case of a second-round run-off against the oligarch Badri Patarkatsishvili.  Such a statement was immediately exploited by his opponents and sensationalized by the media, resulting in significant drop in his poll numbers from which he never recovered.

In May 2008, he ran in the Georgian Parliamentary elections representing Tbilisi’s Saburtalo constituency on the Christian-Democratic Alliance ticket—The Alliance.

On May 6, 2009, while attempting to arbitrate a peaceful outcome in a clash between a disorderly political demonstrators and the riot police, Maisashvili was shot in the head with a rubber bullet.  He eventually made a full recovery from his injuries.

Following the incident, he shifted away from direct involvement in Georgian politics and instead focused on bringing about an ambitious bottom-up educational reform in Georgia through the expansion of his Leadership School, a venture he originally started in 2006 with his American friend and mentor Bob Spears.  The declared aim was to rear "a new generation of skilled, wise and courageous leaders of Georgia."

In March 2015, Maisashvili was diagnosed with Glioblastoma - an aggressive form of brain cancer. 
After undergoing a successful surgery and a chemotherapy treatment, he seemed to have made a recovery - but it was ultimately short lived.

The cancer came back and Gia Maisashvili died on 26 February 2018.  His body was flown from California to Georgia and his funeral held at the Sioni Cathedral in Tbilisi.  Thousands of Georgians attended and paid their respects to the "Leader".

He leaves behind his three children - Sophia, William and Anna.

References

External links 
The Maisashvili campaign website

1962 births
Harvard Kennedy School alumni
Politicians from Tbilisi
Christian-Democratic Movement (Georgia) politicians
Economists from Georgia (country)
2018 deaths